Lu Chao may refer to:

 Lu Chao (artist), Chinese artist
 Chao Lu (boxer) (born 1970), Chinese boxer
 Lu Chao (baseball) (born 1988), Chinese baseball pitcher
 Lü Chao (1890–1951), military and political figure